Memphis Chicks may refer to:
Memphis Chicks (Southern Association), a Minor League Baseball team that played from 1901 to 1960
Memphis Chicks (Southern League), a Minor League Baseball team that played from 1978 to 1997